The 1979 King Cup was the 21st season of the knockout competition since its establishment in 1956. Al-Ahli were the defending champions and successfully defended the title, winning their third one in a row.

Round of 32
The matches of the Round of 32 were held on 9, 10 and 11 May 1979.

Round of 16
The Round of 16 matches were held on 16, 17 and 18 May 1979.

Quarter-finals
The Quarter-final matches were held on 23, 24 and 25 May 1979.

Semi-finals
The four winners of the quarter-finals progressed to the semi-finals. The semi-finals were played on 31 May and 1 June 1979. All times are local, AST (UTC+3).

Final
The final was played between Al-Ahli and Al-Ittihad in the Youth Welfare Stadium in Riyadh. This was the first final to be played by two teams from the same city. Al-Ahli were appearing in their 11th final while Al-Ittihad were appearing in their 8th final.

Top goalscorers

References

1979
Saudi Arabia
Cup